Nikita Vitalyevich Verkhunov (born 2 July 2000) is a Russian football player. He plays for FC Khimik-Avgust Vurnary.

Club career
He made his debut in the Russian Football National League for FC Akron Tolyatti on 1 August 2020 in a game against FC Fakel Voronezh, as a starter.

References

External links
 
 Profile by Russian Football National League
 

2000 births
Sportspeople from Samara, Russia
Living people
Russian footballers
Association football defenders
PFC Krylia Sovetov Samara players
FC Amkar Perm players
FC Akron Tolyatti players
Russian Second League players
Russian First League players